This page provides supplementary chemical data on Cocaine in free base form. More commonly available "powder cocaine" is a hydrochloride salt whose properties will differ.

Material Safety Data Sheet  

The handling of this chemical may incur notable safety precautions. It is highly recommend that you seek the Material Safety Datasheet (MSDS) for this chemical from a reliable source  such as SIRI, and follow its directions.

Structure and properties

Thermodynamic properties

Spectral data

External links
Nuclear magnetic resonance and molecular orbital study of some cocaine analogues, includes superposition and overlay of cocaine, cocaine derivatives, and their minimum energy values.
Conformational changes in dopamine transporter intracellular regions upon cocaine binding and dopamine translocation, thorough-going elucidation of exact mechanism and mode of action specific to cocaine at the dopamine transporter.
Genome Wide Analysis of Chromatin Regulation by Cocaine Reveals a Novel Role for Sirtuins

References 

Chemical data pages
Chemical data pages cleanup